Skindles was a hotel in Maidenhead, England, on the Buckinghamshire bank of the River Thames by Maidenhead Bridge. Formerly the Orkney Arms, built in 1743, it was turned from a coaching inn into a fashionable hotel by William Skindle in 1833. In the 20th century, it became notorious as a place for adulterous assignations. Its guests included Winston Churchill and Princess Margaret. Musicians who performed there included The Stranglers, The Rolling Stones, and The Strawbs. The hotel appears in the film Kind Hearts and Coronets. Skindles is mentioned in the play Journey's End by R. C. Sherriff: 'We danced a bit at Skindles, and drank a lot of port and muck'.

A property developer bought the site in 2006 for just over £30m, but Irish Nationwide bank took it over in 2009 to try to recover a £40m loan. The property was then transferred to the Irish bank NAMA. Barratt Homes and the National Grid then secured an option for most of the site for a joint development project involving housing and a hotel. South Bucks council adopted a residential-led development brief in July 2013 but argued that it would prefer Skindles Hotel itself to be renovated; any demolition proposals would need to be "robustly justified".

By summer 2013, the hotel's condition had begun to fall further into disrepair, with parts of the roof beginning to collapse under the repeated weathering caused by the recent hard winters that hit the UK. The building had been derelict from about the mid-1990s.

The hotel's site was put up for sale by in November 2013, after Barratt's option expired. It was bought by the housebuilder Berkeley Group in February 2014.

Demolition of Skindles and clearance of the surrounding area started around 18 October 2015 to make way for a housing development of nearly 300 homes, office space, a restaurant and walkways along the Thames.  The restaurant on the old hotel site was purchased in 2018 and developed into a French brasserie called Roux at Skindles.

Related names
During the First World War, a popular café in Poperinghe, Belgium, was nicknamed Skindles, after the hotel, by the British officers who patronised it.

A racehorse was named after Skindles Hotel.

References

External links
 Skindles Hotel 1906, Maidenhead, Francis Frith

 Roux at Skindles website, 

Houses completed in 1743
Defunct hotels in England
Buildings and structures on the River Thames
Hotels in Buckinghamshire
Maidenhead
1743 establishments in England